Pertusaria lichexanthoverrucosa is a rare species of crustose and corticolous (bark-dwelling) lichen in the family Pertusariaceae. Found in Bahia, Brazil, it was formally described as a new species in 2018 by lichenologists André Aptroot and Marcela Eugenia da Silva Cáceres. Pertusaria lichexanthoverrucosa is only known to occur at the type locality, which is part of the Chapada Diamantina mountains. The specific epithet lichexanthoverrucosa refers to both the presence of lichexanthone as well as the verrucose (warty) thallus.

See also
List of Pertusaria species

References

lichexanthoverrucosa
Lichen species
Lichens described in 2018
Lichens of Northeast Brazil
Taxa named by André Aptroot
Taxa named by Marcela Cáceres